Jena  is a town in and the parish seat of La Salle Parish, Louisiana, United States.  The population was 3,398 at the 2010 census.

History
Jena was named for Jena, Germany, where French Emperor Napoleon I won the Battle of Jena-Auerstedt in 1806. The town in Louisiana was founded exactly one hundred years later.

In September 2006, Jena became the focus of national news stories in the United States for a racial controversy involving its school system and a group of students known as the Jena Six.

Geography

Surrounding communities
Residents of these rural communities frequent Jena for school, work, and shopping. 
Midway
Olla, Louisiana 
Jonesville, Louisiana  
Trout, Louisiana 
Nebo
Summerville
Good Pine
Possum Point
Belah
Fellowship
White Sulphur Springs
Searcy
Whitehall
Rhinehart

Climate

This region experiences hot summers with rainy days, with no average monthly temperatures above 92 °F.  According to the Köppen Climate Classification system, Jena has a humid subtropical climate, abbreviated "Cfa" on climate maps.

There are mild winters during which intense rainfall occurs. It has hot, rainy summers with moderate rainfall through all year months.

Snow in Jena is possible in winter months.

There are on annual average 76 days with measurable precipitation.

Demographics

2020 census

As of the 2020 United States Census, there were 4,155 people, 1,169 households, and 884 families residing in the town.

2000 census
As of the census of 2000, there were 2,971 people, 1,135 households, and 749 families residing in the town. The racial makeup of the town was 85.56% White, 12.02% African American, 0.67% Native American, 0.47% Asian, 0.50% from other races, and 0.77% from two or more races. Hispanic or Latino of any race were 1.21% of the population.

There were 1,135 households, out of which 29.3% had children under the age of 18 living with them, 52.9% were married couples living together, 10.3% had a female householder with no husband present, and 34.0% were non-families. 31.4% of all households were 21 years of age or older. The average household size was 2.29 and the average family size was 2.86.

In the town, the population was spread out, with 27.5% under the age of 18, 8.8% from 18 to 24, 22.5% from 25 to 44, 22.8% from 45 to 64, and 18.4% who were 65 years of age or older. The median age was 39 years.  For every 100 females, there were 98.9 males. For every 100 females age 18 and over, there were 84.7 males.

The median income for a household in the town was $30,938, and the median income for a family was $39,848. Males had a median income of $31,332 versus $18,317 for females. The per capita income for the town was $13,761. About 9.9% of families and 15.1% of the population were below the poverty line, including 20.2% of those under age 18 and 17.0% of those age 65 or over.

Media

Newspaper 

 The Jena Times

Radio

Education 
The La Salle Parish School Board is located in Jena.

The following schools serve Jena:
 Jena High School, 9–12 (Jena)
 Jena Junior High School, 6,7, & 8 (Jena)
 Goodpine Middle School, 3,4, & 5 (Trout/Goodpine)
 Jena Elementary School, PreK - 2 (Jena)
 Fellowship Elementary School, Pre-K-8 (Belah)
 Nebo Elementary School, PreK-8 (Nebo)
 Temple Christian Academy, Private PreK-8 (Jena)

Infrastructure
 Hospital Service District #2 of LaSalle Parish, also known as LaSalle General Hospital, is a 60-bed medical facility, with a 24-hour emergency department, a home health, a 101-bed nursing home, and physical therapy. 
 Universal Plant Services built a 24,000-square-foot manufacturing facility in Jena. The full-service machining plant represents a $3.9 million capital investment and provides welding, fabrication, equipment overhaul and repair services for pipeline distribution systems and petrochemical processing plants.
 LaSalle Detention Center is an immigration detention facility of the U.S. Immigration and Customs Enforcement, operated by the GEO Group and located on 830 Pinehill Road, about two miles northwest of downtown Jena and it has a capacity of over 1160 detainees.
 Tractor Supply 
 Ace Hardware 
 Walmart Supercenter

Notable people
 Woodie Flowers, MIT professor and co-founder of FIRST
 Mike Francis, prominent businessman and former Louisiana Republican state chairman; born in Jena
 Jason Hatcher, former NFL football player for the Washington Redskins
 Jay F. Honeycutt, former director of the Kennedy Space Center
 Speedy O. Long (1928–2006), a member of the Long political dynasty
 Thomas D. "Tommy" Wright, former state representative from Jena

References

External links

Town of Jena official website
LaSalle General Hospital
LaSalle Parish School Board
Catahoula National Wildlife Refuge 

Towns in Louisiana
Towns in LaSalle Parish, Louisiana
Parish seats in Louisiana